The Deutscher Verein des Gas- und Wasserfaches (DVGW) is the German association for gas and water with headquarters in Bonn. Its official English translation is the German Technical and Scientific Association for Gas and Water. The DVGW was founded in 1859. Its main task is to create the technical regulations for safety and reliability of gas and water supply.

Regulation and standards
In addition to the preparation of the national DVGW rules it also imports the DIN, EN and ISO standards.
The certification activities are done by DVGW CERT GmbH, a wholly owned subsidiary of DVGW.

See also
Fuel cell gas appliances up to 70 kW

References

External links
DVGW Homepage
 

Standards organisations in Germany
Gas technologies